Julie Michelle McCullough (born January 30, 1965) is an American model, actress and stand-up comedian. She was Playboy magazine's Playmate of the Month for February 1986, and played the role of Julie Costello on Growing Pains in 1989–90.

Early life
Julie McCullough, who is of Irish descent, was born in Honolulu, Hawaii and named after a 1950s song called "Oh Julie". She has one older brother, Joey. McCullough's parents divorced when she was four.  Her mother, Nancy, a housewife, married  Herman Paynter, a Marine one year later. In addition to living in Honolulu, she grew up in several states, including North Carolina, West Virginia, Florida, Louisiana, Missouri, Texas, Nevada and California, as well as Canada and Italy. She considers herself Southern, having attended high school in Poplar Bluff, Missouri and Allen, Texas.

Career

Modeling
McCullough worked as a model in her teens before moving to California. In 1983, McCullough graduated from high school and was living in Allen, Texas, when a photographer approached her to pose for Playboy magazine. She became a Playboy model appearing in four issues: February 1985 (on the cover and as part of a "Girls of Texas" pictorial), February 1986 (as Playmate of the Month), September 1986 (on the cover and as part of a "Farmer's Daughters" pictorial) and October 1989 (a post-Growing Pains compilation of her first three shoots with extra pictures).

She also appeared on the cover of "Inside Sports" magazine's swimsuit issue.

In 1989, officials of North Carolina Azalea Festival stripped Julie McCullough of her crown as Azalea Queen of Wilmington, because of controversy surrounding her appearance as a Playboy centerfold.

In 2004, McCullough voiced herself as a tutorial guide in the video game Playboy: The Mansion.

Acting career
McCullough found work in a number of television and film projects. Her work included Max Headroom, The Golden Girls, a role in the 1987 film Big Bad Mama II co-starring Angie Dickinson, Superboy and the 1988 horror movie remake The Blob. She starred in the syndicated adventure series Robin's Hoods as Stacey Wright with singer-actor Rick Springfield. Robin's Hoods lasted one season on television.

Growing Pains
Julie McCullough landed the role of nanny Julie Costello on the television show Growing Pains in 1989. She appeared in eight episodes until she was fired in 1990, which allegedly stemmed from series star Kirk Cameron's conversion to evangelical Christianity, a conversion that, according to The E! True Hollywood Story episode focusing on the show, served to alienate him from his fellow cast members, as he did not invite any of them to his wedding.  In his 2008 autobiography Still Growing, Cameron states that he did not call for her to be fired and the show's producers have claimed that Julie's character was never intended to be a permanent character.  However, the long-told story is that Cameron called for McCullough's termination because of his anger and objections to her having posed nude in Playboy, accusing the show's producers of promoting pornography.  A decade later, Cameron apologized to his TV family for some of his prior behavior due to his lack of maturity.   He reportedly did not reconcile with McCullough, who claims that Cameron refused to speak to her during a later encounter.  She remains critical of him, stating that she lost a lot from the public criticism she endured during the controversy.  McCullough has criticized the evangelical television programming Cameron has produced, which she has viewed on one occasion, saying on her MySpace page:

After the Growing Pains scandal, McCullough made several television appearances on Beverly Hills, 90210, Jake and the Fatman, Harry and the Hendersons, The Golden Girls and Drexell's Class.

Comedy
McCullough now works as a stand-up comedian, and has performed at the Hollywood Improv, the Palms Hotel and Casino, and the Laugh Factory.

McCullough has appeared on the E! reality show The Girls Next Door. She appeared in "Under the Covers", the ninth episode of the first season, which aired in October 2005, "We Can Work It Out", the thirteenth episode of the second season, which aired in November 2006 and "May the Horse Be With You", the second episode of the third season, which aired in March 2007.

Personal life
According to Dave Itzkoff, writing in an article in the June 2006 Playboy magazine, during the rise in popularity of MySpace, McCullough was "Playboy's unofficial ambassador to the MySpace nation."

McCullough celebrated her 50th birthday at the Comedy Store club in Hollywood with a sold-out stand-up comedy show. Guests included Tia Carrere and Pauly Shore.

Music video
Nitro, "Long Way From Home" 1989

Filmography

Film

Television

References

External links 
 
 
 
 
 

1965 births
American film actresses
American women comedians
American stage actresses
American television actresses
American people of Irish descent
Living people
1980s Playboy Playmates
20th-century American actresses
21st-century American comedians
People from Allen, Texas
21st-century American actresses